Hand signals are often given by cyclists and some motorists to indicate their intentions to other traffic.  Under the Vienna Convention on Traffic, bicycles are considered 'vehicles' and cyclists are considered 'drivers', a naming convention reflected in most traffic codes.

In some countries such as the Czech Republic, Canada, and the United States, hand signals apply not only to cyclists, but also to any vehicle whose signal lights are missing or damaged. This rule also applies to drivers of small motorized vehicles such as mopeds and motorcycles.

As in automobiles, cyclists use three primary signals: left turn/overtaking, right turn, and stopping/braking.

Left turn
In right-hand traffic countries, the left turn hand signal is also used to indicate overtaking to the left. 

 All countries  To signal a left turn, the driver horizontally extends their left arm outwards.
 South Africa  The driver extends his/her right arm with the forearm pointing vertically downwards and moving in a circular anti-clockwise motion. Drivers of tractors, animal-drawn vehicles and two-wheeled vehicles are allowed to extend their left arm horizontally with the palm facing forwards. Signal lights or turn indicators, if installed, may be used in the place of hand signals.

Right turn
The same signals are also used for overtaking to the right in Left-hand traffic countries.

 US and Canada (optional) The current convention for signaling a right turn, either while cycling in traffic or cycling with other riders, is to extend the right arm  perpendicularly to the body, pointing in the same direction of the intended turn. Prior to this approach, the convention was for cyclist to extend the left upper-arm out to the left, horizontally and angle one's forearm vertically upward; this practice is no longer in use due to safety concerns. The Uniform Vehicle Code in the US recognizes both signals, although the Code strongly encourages cyclists to use the "arm to the right" technique.  State traffic laws generally conform to the Uniform Vehicle Code, but exceptions may exist. British Columbia (Canada) recognizes both.

 South Africa and Denmark The driver extends their right arm horizontally with the palm to the front. If a vehicle is fitted with turn indicators, they may be used instead.

This signal has the advantage of being more visible to affected traffic, specifically vehicles in the next lane to the right. It is also more easily understood by children.

Slowing down 
 South Africa, Denmark  Sudden reduction in speed requires the same signal as stopping. It is also allowed to extend the right arm horizontally with the palm facing down and move the arm upwards and downwards.

Overtaking 
 South Africa  A vehicle may signal a vehicle behind them to overtake them by extending the right arm below shoulder level, with the palm facing forwards, and moving the arm forwards and backwards.

Stopping/braking

 UK and Ireland  To indicate the slowing of a vehicle, the right arm is horizontally extended palm-down with the hand rotating up and down at the wrist. To indicate coming to a full stop, the right arm is extended vertically, with palm facing forward. However, the latter is not a legally recognised signal.

 US and Canada  The left arm is horizontally extended with the forearm angled downward.

Italy  The right arm is vertically extended with the palm facing forward.

 Australia The right arm is vertically extended with the palm facing forward. Alternatively, the right upper arm is extended horizontally with the forearm extended downwards, palm facing forward.

 Denmark Any arm is extended vertically. It is also common practice to extend the upper arm horizontally with the forearm extended downwards, palm facing forward.

 South AfricaExtend the right upper arm out to the right horizontally and make your forearm vertical with your palm facing forward (as depicted in the US right turn signal above).

Conflict with brake operation

A bicycle's front brake lever is typically installed on the side of the handlebar closest to the center of the road (front-left for right-side driving). In many countries, the hand signal for stopping/braking requires that the cyclist signal with the hand used for the front brake. The front brake is the most effective method of stopping a bike under normal road conditions.

Cyclists, like all other road users, should be ready to make an emergency stop at all times. When approaching a junction a cyclist may wish to "cover the brake" in readiness for an emergency stop. It is not possible to cover both brakes when performing a hand signal and both hands are needed on the handlebars to steady the bicycle under hard braking. Cyclists therefore sometimes have to choose between giving a hand signal and covering the brake.

See also
 Hand gestures
 Outline of cycling
 U.S. Army hand and arm signals
 Vehicular cycling

References 

Cycling
Cycling safety
Automotive safety
Sign systems